Massimiliano Vieri (born 1 September 1978) is a former professional footballer who played as a striker. He is in charge as assistant youth coach for Fiorentina Under-18. Born in Sydney to Italian parents, he won six caps for the Australia national team between 2004 and 2005.

Biography
Vieri is the son of player Roberto Vieri and brother of Italian star Christian Vieri. He was born in Sydney where he grew up. In 1996 he and his family relocated to Italy.

Club career
Vieri was sold to Brescello in co-ownership deal for 30 million lire (€15,494) in 1999. In 2000 Juventus bought back Vieri for undisclosed fee (his brother Christian had also previously played for the club during the 1996–97 Serie A season). Vieri was loaned to Ancona for 100 million lire (€51,646) in 2000–01 season and again in 2001–02 season. In 2002 Vieri joined Verona as part of the deal of Mauro Camoranesi. Vieri's 50% registration rights was valued 1 billion lire at that time (€516,457). In June 2003 Juventus bought back Vieri for €516,457 and bought Camoranesi outright for €5 million. In July 2003 Vieri left for S.S.C. Napoli for €500,000. In June 2004 Juventus gave up the player's remaining 50% registration rights.

After leaving Napoli in 2004, he later had a season-long spell with Ternana, followed by half-season spells with Triestina and Arezzo. In July 2007, he was signed by Lecco, after spending the previous season with Novara. After a season at the club, he joined Prato in 2008. In July 2012, he was released by the club.

International career
Vieri made his international debut for Australia against Turkey in a friendly match in 2004. He received his final international call-up in 2005, totalling six appearances for his country.

Post-playing career
In July 2017, he joined Empoli as assistant coach to Lamberto Zauli for the Primavera Under-19 youth team.

In 2020, Vieri joined the youth coaching staff of Fiorentina as assistant to Renato Buso in charge of the Under-18 team.

Career statistics

International
Appearances and goals by national team and year

Honours 
Australia
 OFC Nations Cup: 2004

References

External links
 OzFootball profile
 

1978 births
Living people
Soccer players from Sydney
Australian soccer players
Association football forwards
Australian expatriate soccer players
Australia international soccer players
Serie B players
A.C. Ancona players
S.S. Arezzo players
A.C. Prato players
Calcio Lecco 1912 players
Alma Juventus Fano 1906 players
Hellas Verona F.C. players
Juventus F.C. players
Novara F.C. players
S.S.C. Napoli players
Ternana Calcio players
U.S. Triestina Calcio 1918 players
Weymouth Wales FC players
Expatriate footballers in Italy
Australian expatriate sportspeople in Italy
2004 OFC Nations Cup players
Australian people of Italian descent
Italian people of French descent
Australian people of French descent
People of Tuscan descent